Eugene Ruppert "Jack" Veiock (February 3, 1888 – June 11, 1922), sometimes known as "J.R.", was an American sportswriter and editor.  He was the sporting editor of the International News Service from 1916 to 1921.

Veiock was born at Rochester, Pennsylvania in 1883.  His father, Albert Veiock, was a Pennsylvania native.  In 1900, Veiock was living with his parents and two younger sisters in Canton, Ohio.  His father was employed as a foreman at a pottery works.  He began his career as a journalist in St. Joseph, Missouri.  From there, he moved to Indianapolis, Indiana, serving as the sporting editor of the Indiana Daily Times from 1914 to 1915.  In January 1916, he was hired as the sporting editor of the International News Service, the wire service for the Hearst Newspapers.  He remained as the sporting editor of the INS for six years until he was forced into retirement by illness.  He developed pleurisy while covering the 1919 World Series.  In July 1920, he traveled to Antwerp, Belgium to cover the 1920 Summer Olympics for the INS.  In the fall of 1921, he developed tuberculosis after covering the Army-Navy football game in the rain.  He was sent to a sanitarium in Ripton, Vermont, where he died of pneumonia in June 1922.  He was buried at Monmouth Cemetery in Monmouth, Illinois.

Selected articles by Veiock
Jess Willard Is 'Corn Fed': World's Pugilistic Champion Says He Tips Scales at 270 Pounds (Jess Willard), December 7, 1916
Playing the Field (Jack Barry), August 13, 1917
Fitzsimmons Was Notable Ring Figure ("Ruby Bob" Fitzsimmons), October 22, 1917
Sox Are Glad To Go West (1917 World Series), The Pittsburgh Press, October 12, 1917
Three Teams May Lay Claim To Title (1917 college football season), November 19, 1917
Much Fame Has Been Denied Howard Berry (Howard Berry), November 21, 1917
Critics Do Not Give Beckett Much Credit (Joe Beckett), September 3, 1919 
Dempsey Is Eager To Fight (Jack Dempsey), September 11, 1919
Collins To Play In Sixth World Series This Season (Eddie Collins), September 16, 1919
Veiock Picks Gleason's Men To Win Series (1919 World Series), The Pittsburgh Press, September 25, 1919
Leonard Fails To Land Kayo On Johnny Dundee (Benny Leonard/Johnny Dundee), February 10, 1920
Prospect of Olympic Team Very Bright (1920 Summer Olympics), March 20, 1920
Indians and Robins, With Victory Apiece, Renew Struggle (1920 World Series), October 7, 1920
Babe Ruth Is On His Way To New Record (Babe Ruth), April 22, 1921
Pete Herman Meets Lynch Next Monday (Pete Herman), The Pittsburgh Press, July 20, 1921
Herman Regains Laurels (Pete Herman), The Pittsburgh Press, July 26, 1921
Notre Dame Wins By Perfection In Forward Pass, November 9, 1921
Landis Players' Friend: Warns Magnates Against Keeping Any Man From Advancing In His Chosen Profession (Kenesaw Mountain Landis), December 8, 1921
1921 Was Brilliant Year In All Sports Divisions, December 24, 1921

References

1888 births
1922 deaths
People from Rochester, Pennsylvania
Writers from Indianapolis
Burials in Illinois
Deaths from pneumonia in Vermont
Journalists from Pennsylvania
Sportswriters from Pennsylvania